Nayar River is a perennial, non-glacial river in the North Indian state of Uttarakhand. The river system is one of the largest non-glacial perennial rivers in the state, second only to Ramganga (West) and flows entirely in the district of Pauri Garhwal. The two main branches of the river, Nayar East and Nayar West along with Ramganga river, rise in the dense forests and high meadows of Dudhatoli and merge to form Nayar roughly one kilometre ahead of Satpuli. Satpuli is a town on the left bank of Nayar East river.

Etymology
As per historical records and ancient Hindu religious texts the river was called Narad Ganga. The present name of the river "Nayar" is presumably derived from its ancient name "Narad Ganga". In its native range, both the branches of Nayar, i.e., Nayar East and West are referred to as Nayar only.

Watercourse
Both the rivers have a combined length of approximately 200 kilometers and are hardly two-feet wide near their respective sources. Although both the rivers are nearly equal in length, the Eastern branch has a higher volume of water as the first half of its course lies in dense forested regions. Nayar East rises in the meadows of Dudhatoli in a high altitude valley sheltered by towering mountains of over 10,000 feet. Several shepherd’s huts are built along its course from its source to the first major human settlement, Maroda village. Some of the great sages are believed to have did penance near its origin. Rishi Chyavana is said to have invented Chyavanprash from medicinal herbs found in Dudhatoli mountains. The river forms an intricate network of riparian systems supporting wild animals and plants in its valley. These shadowed valleys remain snow-bound for weeks. Nayar West rises at a relatively lower altitude and has a lesser catchment area which explains its lesser volume. Since these rivers are non-glacial, they totally depend on precipitation. In days of less precipitation such as winter, the volume of these rivers goes down by up to 50 percent. The water-level gets visibly low during winter season and one can see the river-bed through the transparent water which becomes as clear as air.

In popular culture
Although very few people know of the river out of its range, yet the locals dote on it. Nayar, like a typical non-glacial perennial river of lower Himalayas, is the lifeline to inhabitants of its valley. Lives of many villagers living in its valley revolve around the river throughout the river. It provides not only fresh fish but also clean water for irrigation purposes. At the widest point of Nayar East, i.e the stretch from Syunsi to Gudinda, it has formed a broad and fertile valley. Such stretches have a higher density as upper reaches of the rivercourse has steep cliffs and unyielding soil. The higher it gets, the least populated it becomes.

Folklore
As the Nayar and its tributaries merge with the holy Ganga, it is revered by locals. Many villages use some selected stretches of the river-bed as public cremation grounds. Remote high-altitude villages use alpine streams (tributaries of the Nayar) for cremation and religious purposes. Though not used frequently, population being less dense. Such sites are marked by giant old Peepal trees and people generally don't roam around there. One may not be surprised to find shards of animal or even human bones or copper/bronze ceremonial vessels in the river. Cremation grounds may explain the water-phobia or rather valley-phobia of people in these parts. It is believed that crying or weeping near water bodies such as mountain streams, pools & rivers and the echoing of the sound will attract spirits. Many claim that they have been troubled by such spirits for months on end until they conducted a grand Puja and worshiped them for a riddance. Just like how some people are shown to be possessed by evil Djinns in Islamic world. Many elders in these valleys are considered to be "experts" in these matters, a very mild and subtle version of the African Witch-doctors. At times a cockerel is demanded to be used as a scapegoat, the evil spirit is "captured" in it and then it is released free. Historically, these valleys used to be heavily populated in post-independence years, drownings in the river were not uncommon. Those incidents have somehow affected the psychology of local folks, and it might be said that these old-wives tales were formed to keep mischievous kids away from the river.

Hydroelectricity
The below mentioned hydroelectricity projects have been developed in the valleys of Nayar East and Nayar West. Their installed capacities (which are understandably low, given the discharge of these rivers) have also been given. Also, the demand for electricity is quite low in these sparsely populated valleys and hence the amount generated is just enough to meet the local demand.

Gauni Chhira (Waterfall) on Nayar East with an installed capacity of 0.5 Megawatt.
Santudhar I on Nayar West with an installed capacity of 2 Megawatts.
Santudhar II on Nayar West with an installed capacity of 2 Megawatts.
Byaligaon on Nayar East with an installed capacity of 2.25 Megawatts.
Nayar Project on Nayar with an installed capacity of 17 Megawatts. (Near Devprayag)
Dunao on Nayar East with an installed capacity of 1.5 Megawatt.

References

Rivers of Uttarakhand
Rivers of India